The 1986 Manila Beer Brewmasters season was the 3rd and final season of the Asia Brewery franchise in the Philippine Basketball Association (PBA).

Transactions

Occurrences
The Brewmasters were handled by multi-titled amateur coach Joe Lipa at the start of the season, taking over from Olympian Edgardo Ocampo. After failing to lead Manila Beer past eliminations in the first conference, Lipa was replaced by another former Olympian Tito Eduque as Manila Beer head coach beginning the All-Filipino Conference. Coach Eduque bring along former PBA coaches Jun Celis and Nemie Villegas as his assistants.

Finals stint
After a disappointing finishes in the first two conferences of the season, Manila Beer came back strong in the Third Conference, just like in the previous year. The Brewmasters were on their third finals appearance in franchise history, behind imports Michael Young, a first round pick of the Boston Celtics in the 1984 NBA draft, and Santa Clara star Harold Keeling.

Manila Beer lost to crowd-favorite Ginebra San Miguel in five games in the best-of-seven title series.

Award
Michael Young won the PBA Best Import honors in the 1986 Open Conference, besting two-time best import awardee Billy Ray Bates of Ginebra.

Roster

Imports

References

Manila Beer Brewmasters seasons
Manila